Lagarde may refer to:

Places in France
 Lagarde, Ariège
 Lagarde, Haute-Garonne
 Lagarde, Gers
 Lagarde, Moselle
 Lagarde, Hautes-Pyrénées
 Lagarde-d'Apt, Vaucluse département
 Lagarde-Enval, Corrèze département
 Lagarde-Hachan, Gers département
 Lagarde-Paréol, Vaucluse département
 Lagarde-sur-le-Né, Charente département

People
 Lagarde (surname), list of people named Lagarde with Wikipedia articles

Wine
 Lagarde (winery), Mendoza, Argentina

See also
 La Garde (disambiguation)
 Legarde (disambiguation)
 Garde (disambiguation)
 LGarde (company)
 Thompson-LaGarde Tests, a series of military tests that led to the adoption of the .45 ACP Cartridge.